Ngecha is a settlement in Kenya's Central Province.

It is the home of Ngugi wa Thiong'o, one of East Africa's greatest novelists, and a nominee for a Nobel prize for literature.

References 

Populated places in Central Province (Kenya)